Ataraxia is a Greek philosophical term for freedom from perturbation.

Ataraxia may also refer to:
 Ataraxia/Taraxis, a 2012 EP by Chicago post-metal band Pelican
 Ataraxia (band), an Italian neoclassical band
 Ataraxia, an album by Passport
 Ataraxia: The Unexplained, a 1975 album by Mort Garson
 Ataraxia, a 2005 song by the post-rock band Team Sleep on their self-titled album, Team Sleep
 "Ataraxia (Media Intro)", a track on the album So Much for the Afterglow by Everclear
 Ataraxia, a fictional planet in the manga series Toward the Terra
 Nate Mark, or Ataraxia (video gamer), professional Smite player
 Ataraxia, a track on the 2005 album Perfect Pitch Black by Cave In
Ataraxia, a track on the 2021 album L.W. by the Australian rock band King Gizzard & the Lizard Wizard

See also
 Hydroxyzine, or Atarax, a clinical drug used for the treatment of anxiety